The Dain Curse is a novel by Dashiell Hammett, published in 1929. Before its publication in book form, it was serialized in Black Mask magazine in 1928 and 1929.

Serial publication 
The Dain Curse was originally serialized in four installments in the pulp magazine Black Mask:

Part 1: "Black Lives" (Black Mask, November 1928)
Part 2: "The Hollow Temple" (Black Mask, December 1928)
Part 3: "Black Honeymoon" (Black Mask, January 1929)
Part 4: "Black Riddle" (Black Mask, February 1929)

The novel of the same title based on the Black Mask serial is composed of three parts, each concerning different mysteries — Part One, The Dains; Part Two, The Temple; and Part Three, Quesada.

Plot summary
The story is told in the first person, and the nameless detective known only as The Continental Op investigates a theft of diamonds from the Leggett family of San Francisco. The plot involves a supposed curse on the Dain family, said to inflict sudden and violent deaths upon those in their vicinity. Edgar Leggett's wife is a Dain, as is his daughter Gabrielle. The detective untangles a web of robberies, lies and murder. It is discovered that Gabrielle Leggett is under the influence of a mysterious religious cult and is also addicted to morphine.

Gabrielle escapes from the cult and marries her fiancé Eric Collinson, but bloodshed continues to follow her. The Continental Op, on behalf of four successive clients, investigates the reason behind all the mysterious, violent events surrounding Gabrielle Leggett, which he eventually uncovers.  The concluding chapters of the novel contain a detailed description of how the Op weans her from her drug habit, and the novel ends on a hopeful note.

Characters in The Dain Curse 

 The Continental Op – private detective (called in the miniseries "Hamilton Nash")
 Madison Andrews – Leggett's attorney
 Claude Baker – witnessed Gabrielle driving away in Quesada
 Mrs. Begg – the Leggetts' former servant
 Eric Carter – Collinson's alias in Quesada
 Ralph Coleman – member of Temple of the Holy Grail cult
 Eric Collinson – Gabrielle's fiancé, employed at Spear, Camp and Duffy
 Hubert Collinson – Eric's father
 Laurence Collinson – Eric's older brother
 Daisy Cotton – Dick Cotton's wife
 Dick Cotton – Quesada marshal
 Alice Dain – Mrs. Leggett's maiden name
 Lily Dain – Alice's sister, Gabrielle's mother
 Warren Daley – the Leggetts' neighbor
 Debro – "Carters'" nearest neighbor in Quesada
 Sheriff Feeney – in Quesada
 Mrs. Fink – employee at Temple of the Holy Grail
 Tom Fink – Special effects man at Temple of the Holy Grail
 Owen Fitzstephan – a writer and friend of Nash's
 Dick Foley – Continental detective
 Big-foot Gerber – cigar store owner
 Aaronia Haldorn – Joseph's wife
 Joseph Haldorn – head of Temple of the Holy Grail cult
 Manuel Haldorn – Joseph and Aaronia's son
 Watt Halstead – of Halstead and Beauchamp, a jeweler
 Mr. & Mrs. Harper – Gabrielle's mysterious friends
 Minnie Hershey – the Leggett's servant
 Jacques Labaud – Mayenne/Leggett's fellow convict/escapee
 Gabrielle Leggett – daughter of Edgar Leggett
 Edgar Leggett – Gabrielle's father, a scientist
 Mrs. Leggett, née Alice Dain
 Mickey Linehan – Continental operative
 MacMan - Continental operative
 Walter Martin – Mayenne/Leggett's alias
 Al Mason – Continental operative
 Maurice Pierre de Mayenne – Edgar Legett's real name
 Mary Nunez – "Carters'" servant
 O'Gar – homicide detail detective sergeant, San Francisco Police Department
 The Old Man - the head of the Continental Detective Agency
 Mrs. Priestly – neighbor of the Leggetts
 Pat Reddy – O'Gar's partner, San Francisco Police Department
 Dr. Riese – Doctor responding to finding of Leggett's body, Gabrielle's doctor
 Mrs. Livingston Rodman – Member of Temple of the Holy Grail cult
 Ben Rolly – Quesada deputy sheriff
 Harry Ruppert – Upton's employee
 Jack Santos - a San Francisco reporter
 Rhino Tingley – Minnie's boyfriend
 Louis Upton – private detective from New York
 Vernon – Quesada district attorney
 Harve Whidden – witness who saw Gabrielle and a man driving away in Quesada

TV mini-series adaptation 
The novel was adapted into a CBS television miniseries in 1978, by director E.W. Swackhamer and producer Martin Poll, which starred James Coburn (as the Op, given the name "Hamilton Nash" for this film version), Hector Elizondo (as Ben Feeney), Jean Simmons (as Aaronia Haldorn), Jason Miller (as Owen Fitzstephan), Beatrice Straight (as Alice Leggett), Paul Stewart (as the Old Man), Nancy Addison (as Gabrielle Leggett), Tom Bower (as Sergeant O'Gar), David Canary (as Jack Santos), Beeson Carroll (as Marshall Cotton), Roland Winters (as Hubert Collinson) and a pre-Star Trek Brent Spiner (as Tom Fink).

It received three Emmy Award nominations (one for the director). The script, by Robert W. Lenski, won the 1978 Edgar Award for Best Television Feature or Miniseries.

An edited version of the series was released on VHS in the 1990s; a complete, full-length, two-disc DVD edition is available.

Coburn said " “We went for a mood piece and a lot of it worked. For television, it was pretty good. Still, we had to fight the network (CBS) to make it the way we intended to do it. We didn’t want too many close-ups. They didn’t understand. They said this is television and that’s not the way to shoot it Well, I said, ‘fuck  ‘em, let’s shoot it like a film’, and you know what?, we did for the most part.”

References

External links 
 
 Audio files of book
 

1929 American novels
Novels by Dashiell Hammett
Fictional cults
Alfred A. Knopf books
Novels set in San Francisco
Hardboiled crime novels
Works originally published in Black Mask (magazine)
American novels adapted into television shows